Municipal elections were held in the city of Westmount, Quebec, Canada on 4 November 2017 as part of the 2017 Quebec municipal elections. Voters elected 8 positions on the Westmount City Council, as well as one mayor. On October 5, returning City Councillor Philip A. Cutler and newcomer Jeff Shamie were acclaimed.

Election Notes

Cynthia Lulham was elected for a 7th term, extending her record as the longest serving council member. 6 of the 8 councillors were newcomers, with only Cutler and Lulham (along with Mayor Smith) returning.

Mayor

Westmount City Council Candidates

District 1

District 2

District 3

District 4

District 5

District 6

District 7

District 8

References

Westmount, Quebec
2017 Quebec municipal elections